Revanna Umadevi Nagaraj (born 11 February 1965), is an Indian professional player of English billiards and snooker. She is a World Women's Billiard champion (2012) and a six-time Indian national Billiards champion.
She had defeated World No 13 Eva Palmius during the London 2012 Championship to become the World Champion.

Life
Umadevi was born in 1965. It was in the midst of her life, when Umadevi realised her potentials in Billiards. While working as a typist in Bangalore, she used to go to the Karnataka Government Secretariat Club to play table tennis. One day, while waiting for a long time for her turn for table tennis, she decided to move on to the Billiards table next to the table tennis room and gradually started loving the game. Post that, Umadevi never looked back but towards the path of glory with a cue stick on her hand, focussing only at the colourful balls on the green table top. Towards a successful sports career, she was mentored by prominent billiards players and coaches such as Shri. Arvind Savur, S. Jairaj, and M. G Jayaram. In 2012, Umadevi bagged the title of World Billiards Champion as well as the 8 Ball Pool National Champion. Umadevi is still giving her best efforts to top-notch the upcoming billiards events of international stage and planning to coach the burgeoning stars to shine in the respective sports niche after her retirement.

Awards
She was awarded Eklavaya Award in 2009 for her contribution to Billiards by the Government of Karnataka.  She became the World Billiards Champion and 8 Ball Pool National Champion in 2012. She received Nari Shakti Puraskar from the President of India Ram Nath Kovind among the list of 30 great women achievers of 2017 in India.

Titles and achievements

References

Living people
1965 births
Indian players of English billiards
Indian snooker players
Place of birth missing (living people)
Female players of English billiards
Female snooker players
World champions in English billiards